Henry Laurens (December 8, 1792) was an American Founding Father,  merchant, slave trader, and rice planter from South Carolina who became a political leader during the Revolutionary War. A delegate to the Second Continental Congress, Laurens succeeded John Hancock as its president. He was a signatory to the Articles of Confederation and, as president, presided over its passage.

Laurens had earned great wealth as a partner in the largest slave-trading house in North America, Austin and Laurens. In the 1750s alone, this Charleston firm oversaw the sale of more than 8,000 enslaved Africans. Laurens served for a time as vice president of South Carolina and as the United States minister to the Netherlands during the Revolutionary War. He was captured at sea by the British and imprisoned for a little more than a year in the Tower of London. His oldest son, John Laurens, was an aide-de-camp to George Washington and a colonel in the Continental Army.

Early life and education
Laurens' forebears were Huguenots who fled France after the Edict of Nantes was revoked in 1685. His grandfather Andre Laurens left earlier, in 1682, and eventually made his way to America, settling first in New York City and then Charleston, South Carolina. Andre's son John married Hester (or Esther) Grasset, also a Huguenot refugee. Henry was their third child and eldest son. John Laurens became a saddler, and his business eventually grew to be the largest of its kind in the colonies.

In 1744, Laurens was sent to London to augment his business training. This took place in the company of Richard Oswald. His father died in 1747, bequeathing a considerable estate to 23-year-old Henry.

Marriage and family
Laurens married Eleanor Ball, also of a South Carolina rice planter family, on June 25, 1750. They had thirteen children, many of whom died in infancy or childhood. Eleanor died in 1770, one month after giving birth to their last child. Laurens took their three sons to England for their education, encouraging their oldest, John Laurens, to study law. Instead of completing his studies, John Laurens returned to the United States in 1776 to serve in the American Revolutionary War.

Political career

Laurens served in the militia, as did most able-bodied men in his time. He rose to the rank of lieutenant colonel in the campaigns against the Cherokee Indians in 1757–1761, during the French and Indian War (also known as the Seven Years' War).
In 1757, he was elected to South Carolina's colonial assembly. Laurens was elected again every year but one until the Revolution replaced the assembly with a state convention as an interim government. The year he missed was 1773, when he visited England to arrange for his sons' educations. He was named to the colony's council in 1764 and 1768 but declined both times. In 1772, he joined the American Philosophical Society of Philadelphia and carried on extensive correspondence with other members.

As the American Revolution neared, Laurens was at first inclined to support reconciliation with the British Crown. But as conditions deteriorated, he came to fully support the American position.  When Carolina began to create a revolutionary government, Laurens was elected to the Provincial Congress, which first met on January 9, 1775.  He was president of the Committee of Safety and presiding officer of that congress from June until March 1776.  When South Carolina installed a fully independent government, he served as the vice president of South Carolina from March 1776 to June 27, 1777. Laurens was first named a delegate to the Continental Congress on January 10, 1777.  He served in the Congress until 1780.  He was the president of the Continental Congress from November 1, 1777, to December 9, 1778.

In the fall of 1779, the Congress named Laurens their minister to the Netherlands. In early 1780, he took up that post and successfully negotiated Dutch support for the war. But on his return voyage to Amsterdam that fall, the British frigate  intercepted his ship, the continental packet Mercury, off the banks of Newfoundland. Although his dispatches were tossed in the water, they were retrieved by the British, who discovered the draft of a possible U.S.-Dutch treaty prepared in Aix-la-Chapelle in 1778 by William Lee and the Amsterdam banker Jean de Neufville.  This prompted Britain to declare war on the Dutch Republic, becoming known as the Fourth Anglo-Dutch War.

The British charged Laurens with treason, transported him to England, and imprisoned him in the Tower of London (he is the only American to have been held prisoner in the tower). His imprisonment was protested by the Americans. In the field, most captives were regarded as prisoners of war, and while conditions were frequently appalling, prisoner exchanges and mail privileges were accepted practice. During his imprisonment, Laurens was assisted by Richard Oswald, his former business partner and the principal owner of Bunce Island, a slave-trading island base in the Sierra Leone River. Oswald argued on Laurens' behalf to the British government. Finally, on December 31, 1781, he was released in exchange for General Lord Cornwallis and completed his voyage to Amsterdam. He helped raise funds for the American effort.

Laurens' oldest son, Colonel John Laurens, was killed in 1782 in the Battle of the Combahee River, as one of the last casualties of the Revolutionary War. He had supported enlisting and freeing slaves for the war effort and suggested to his father that he begin with the 40 he stood to inherit.  He had urged his father to free the family's slaves, but although conflicted, Henry Laurens never manumitted his 260 slaves.

In 1783, Laurens was sent to Paris as one of the peace commissioners for the negotiations leading to the Treaty of Paris. While he was not a signatory of the primary treaty, he was instrumental in reaching the secondary accords that resolved issues related to the Netherlands and Spain. Richard Oswald, a former partner of Laurens in the slave trade, was the principal negotiator for the British during the Paris peace talks.

Laurens generally retired from public life in 1784. He was sought for a return to the Continental Congress, the Constitutional Convention in 1787 and the state assembly, but he declined all of these positions. He did serve in the state convention of 1788, where he voted to ratify the United States Constitution.

British forces, during their occupation of Charleston, had burned the Laurens home at Mepkin during the war. When Laurens and his family returned in 1784, they lived in an outbuilding while the great house was rebuilt. He lived on the estate the rest of his life, working to recover the estimated £40,000 that the revolution had cost him (equivalent to about $ in ).

Death and legacy
Laurens suffered from gout starting in his 40s and the affliction plagued him throughout the rest of his life. Laurens died on December 8, 1792, at his estate, Mepkin, in South Carolina. In his will he stated he wished to be cremated and his ashes be interred at his estate. It is reported that he was the first Caucasian cremation in the United States, which he chose because of a fear of being buried alive. Afterward, the estate passed through several hands. Large portions of the estate still exist. Part of the original estate was donated to the Roman Catholic Church in 1949 and is now the location of Mepkin Abbey, a monastery of the  Order of Cistercians of the Strict Observance (Trappist monks).

The city of Laurens, South Carolina, and its county are named for him. The town and the village of Laurens, New York, are named for him. Laurens County, Georgia, is named for his son John. General Lachlan McIntosh, who worked for Laurens as a clerk and became close friends with him, named Fort Laurens in Ohio after him.

Notes

References

Sources
 Kirschke, James J., and Victor J. Sensenig. "Steps toward nationhood: Henry Laurens (1724–92) and the American Revolution in the South" Historical Research 78.200 (2005): 180–192
 
 , 16 vols.; Collection Inventory available at the Historical Society of Pennsylvania.
 McDonough, Daniel J. Christopher Gadsden and Henry Laurens: The Parallel Lives of Two American Patriots  (Susquehanna University Press, 2001)
 Neville, Gabriel. "The Tragedy of Henry Laurens." Journal of the American Revolution, Aug. 1, 2019

External links

 
 National Park Service: Henry Laurens Biography
 Forgotten Founders Biography site
 Henry Laurens, South Carolina Hall of Fame, South Carolina Educational Television
  – cenotaph
 Henry Laurens Account Book, 1766-1773, Lowcountry Digial Library
 Friends of Fort Laurens

1724 births
1792 deaths
Ambassadors of the United States to the Netherlands
American Revolutionary War prisoners of war held by Great Britain
American planters
American slave traders
American slave owners
Prisoners in the Tower of London
Colonial American merchants
Huguenot participants in the American Revolution
Colonial South Carolina
Continental Congressmen from South Carolina
18th-century American politicians
Businesspeople from Charleston, South Carolina
People of pre-statehood South Carolina
People of South Carolina in the American Revolution
People of South Carolina in the French and Indian War
Pre-statehood history of South Carolina
Signers of the Articles of Confederation
Cremation
Politicians from Charleston, South Carolina
18th-century Anglicans
Founding Fathers of the United States